Treggings are leggings styled to look like trousers. Much like jeggings, treggings is a portmanteau of trousers and leggings.

Treggings fit just like leggings, but are made out of a thicker fabric.

Controversy

There has been some controversy about whether they can be considered  trousers. A British school decided to send 60 students showing up in treggings home on the reason that the clothing was too tight to be worn as trousers.

Fashion

The tregging is very popular among young women as an alternative to stockings or trousers. They can be worn under a skirt or as a trouser. Balmain included the tregging in their fall/winter 2009 collection.

References 

Hosiery